This is a list of years in Qatar.

20th century

21st century

See also
 Timeline of Doha

 
History of Qatar
Qatar-related lists
Qatar